Los Cedros Airport,  is an airport located in an agricultural valley south of the Mataquito River in the Sagrada Familia commune of Chile's Maule Region. The nearest community is Villa Prat (es),  to the north.

See also

Transport in Chile
List of airports in Chile

References

External links
OpenStreetMap - Los Cedros Airport
OurAirports - Los Cedros
FallingRain - Los Cedros Airport

Airports in Chile
Airports in Maule Region